Louis Cyrille Jean Benoît She (31 August 1999 – 6 April 2022), better known as Abraham Sie, was an Ivorian basketball player. During his career he played for the Ivory Coast national basketball team.

Club career
Sie was a former football player and taekwondo fighter, he was the Ivorian taekwondo champion twice before he started playing basketball. He played for the Ivorian side Abidjan Basket Club, he participated in the Basketball Africa League qualifiers where he averaged 14.33 points, 3.4 rebounds and 4.7 assists.

In October 2021, Sie signed with DUC Dakar, the champions of Senegal.

Ivorian national team
Sie represented the Ivory Coast national basketball team. He was included in the Ivorian team roster for the 2019 FIBA Basketball World Cup, but he did not play a match based on the decision of the coach.

Death
Sie died on 6 April 2022 in Abidjan at age 22, as was announced by his club DUC Dakar.

Honours
ABC Fighters
Ivorian Basketball Championship winner: 2019, 2020; runner-up: 2021

References

External links
 RealGM profile

1999 births
2022 deaths
2019 FIBA Basketball World Cup players
Abidjan Basket Club players
Ivorian basketball players
Point guards
DUC Dakar players
Senegalese expatriate basketball people in Ivory Coast
Sportspeople from Abidjan